A jamboree is a large gathering of Scouts who rally at a national or international level

Jamboree may also refer to:

Film and television
 Jamboree (1944 film), a film directed by Joseph Santley
 Jamboree (1957 film) (UK title: Disc Jockey Jamboree), a rock 'n' roll film directed by Roy Lockwood
 Jamboree (TV series), a UK children's programme broadcast by CITV

Music
 Jamboree (Beat Happening album), or the title song
 Jamboree (Fast Life Yungstaz album), or the title song
 Jamboree (Guadalcanal Diary album), or the title song
 "Jamboree" (song), a 1999 song by Naughty by Nature
 Jazz Jamboree Festival
 WWVA Jamboree, a country music radio program on WWVA-AM, Wheeling, West Virginia
 Jamboree, a 1956 Radio Luxembourg music program presented by Alan Freed
 The Jamboree (music festival), an annual music festival held in Toledo, Ohio

See also
Jamboree 2008 (disambiguation)
Jambo (disambiguation)